Shiho Hisamatsu (born 4 July 1979) is a Japanese former tennis player.

Hisamatsu won seven singles titles and nine doubles titles on the ITF Circuit. She reached career-high rankings by the WTA of 143 in singles and 185 in doubles.

In 2019, Hisamatsu only played six matches (five in singles, one win) on the pro circuit. Since December 2019, she has not been playing any more.

ITF Circuit finals

Singles: 16 (7 titles, 9 runner-ups)

Doubles: 20 (9 titles, 11 runner-ups)

External links
 
 

1979 births
Living people
Japanese female tennis players
People from Kagoshima
20th-century Japanese women
21st-century Japanese women